The 2011 Rally Italia Sardegna was the fifth round of the 2011 World Rally Championship season. The rally took place over 6–8 May, and was based in Olbia, the fourth-largest town on the island of Sardinia. The rally was also the third round of the Super 2000 World Rally Championship and the second round of the WRC Academy. Sardinia returned to the WRC calendar for the first time since 2009, after the event was a part of the Intercontinental Rally Challenge in 2010.

Sébastien Loeb took his second win of the season and the 64th WRC win of his career after holding off challenges from Mikko Hirvonen and Petter Solberg on the final day of the rally, despite having to run most of the event first on the road and being disadvantaged by sweeping away loose gravel. In the junior classes, Ott Tänak won his first SWRC event by finishing seventh overall, 26.7 seconds ahead of Juho Hänninen, who was eighth overall. Egon Kaur won the WRC Academy for the second event running.

Results

Event standings

† – The WRC Academy features only the first two legs of the rally.

Special stages

Power Stage
The "Power stage" was a live, televised  stage at the end of the rally, held in Gallura.

References

External links
 Results at eWRC.com
 Home page

Sardinia
Rally Sardinia
Rally Italia Sardegna